The Eurovision Young Musicians 1992 was the sixth edition of the Eurovision Young Musicians, held at Cirque Royal in Brussels, Belgium on 9 June 1992. Organised by the European Broadcasting Union (EBU) and host broadcaster Radio Télévision Belge Francophone (RTBF), musicians from eight countries participated in the televised final. A total of thirteen countries took part in the competition.

Bartłomiej Nizioł of Poland won the contest, with Spain and Belgium placing second and third respectively. It marked the first time any country had won on their first participation in any Eurovision event since Switzerland's victory at the first Eurovision Song Contest in 1956, and has not been repeated since. Technically, it would also mark the only time a country won a Eurovision event without their broadcaster being a full member of the EBU, as the Polish broadcaster (TVP) wouldn't formally join the EBU until the following year.

By the time of the contest, United Nations Security Council Resolution 757 (adopted 30 May 1992) had already placed sanctions on FR Yugoslavia, which included a ban on its participation in international contests and cultural events. Therefore, this was the last participation of Yugoslavia at any Eurovision event.

Location

Cirque Royale (French) or Koninklijk Circus (Dutch) an entertainment venue in Brussels, Belgium, was the host venue for the 1992 edition of the Eurovision Young Musicians. Conceived by architect Wilhelm Kuhnen, the building has a circular appearance but in fact is constructed as a regular polygon. It can hold 3,500 spectators, and nowadays is primarily used for live music shows.

Results

Preliminary round
A total of thirteen countries took part in the preliminary round of the 1992 contest, of which eight qualified to the televised grand final. The following countries failed to qualify.
  Cyprus

Final
Awards were given to the top three countries. The table below highlights these using gold, silver, and bronze. The placing results of the remaining participants is unknown and never made public by the European Broadcasting Union.

Jury members
The only person known to have been a member of the jury is Carlos Païta who was the chairman.

Broadcasting
EBU members from the following countries broadcast the final round.

Official album

6th Eurovision Competition For Young Musicians was the official compilation album of the 1992 Contest, put together by the European Broadcasting Union and released by Pavane Records after the contest in June 1992.

See also
 Eurovision Song Contest 1992

Notes

References

External links 
 

Eurovision Young Musicians by year
1992 in music
1992 in Belgium
Music festivals in Belgium
Events in Brussels
June 1992 events in Europe